Luke Francis Bard (born November 13, 1990) is an American professional baseball pitcher in the Toronto Blue Jays organization. He has previously played in Major League Baseball (MLB) for the Los Angeles Angels, Tampa Bay Rays and New York Yankees.

Career

Amateur career
Bard attended Charlotte Christian School in Charlotte, North Carolina, and the Georgia Institute of Technology, where he played college baseball for the Georgia Tech Yellow Jackets. In 2010 and 2011, he played collegiate summer baseball with the Brewster Whitecaps of the Cape Cod Baseball League.

Minnesota Twins
The Minnesota Twins selected Bard in the first round of the 2012 Major League Baseball draft. He signed and made his professional debut that same year with the Gulf Coast League Twins before being reassigned to the Elizabethton Twins. In seven games between the two teams, he posted a 3.86 ERA. In 2013, he pitched for the GCL Twins, Elizabethton, and the Fort Myers Miracle, going 1–0 with a 3.65 ERA in  total innings pitched between the three teams. He missed 2014 and 2015 due to injury. Bard returned in 2016 and he spent the season with Fort Myers and the Chattanooga Lookouts, going 3–1 with a 3.74 ERA in 44 relief appearances. In 2017, he was 4–3 with a 2.76 ERA in  innings pitched between the Lookouts and Rochester Red Wings.

Los Angeles Angels
The Angels selected Bard in the Rule 5 draft after the 2017 season. He made the Angels' Opening Day 25-man roster, and made his major league debut on March 31.

After he was designated for assignment by the Angels, Bard was returned to the Twins on April 27.

On February 16, 2019, Bard signed a minor-league contract with the Los Angeles Angels. He made the team out of spring training and had his contract purchased before the season. He was sent down multiple times to the minors through the whole season, appearing in only 32 games for the Angels. Bard pitched in  innings for the Angels in 2020, registering a 6.75 ERA and seven strikeouts.

On March 29, 2021, Bard was placed on the 60-day injured list with a hip injury. On April 8, 2021, it was announced that Bard would undergo season-ending hip surgery. Bard had hip resurfacing surgery on his right hip on May 20, 2021, at the Hospital for Special Surgery. On October 23, 2021, Bard elected free agency.

Tampa Bay Rays
On March 24, 2022, Bard signed a minor league contract with the Tampa Bay Rays. On May 18, Bard was selected to the 40-man roster and immediately optioned to the Triple-A Durham Bulls.

Bard pitched for Durham until he was called up by Rays on June 7. The next evening he made his major league return with a one-hit, two-strikeout two-inning outing versus the St. Louis Cardinals. On August 1, 2022, the Rays designated Bard for assignment.

New York Yankees
On August 5, 2022, the New York Yankees claimed Bard off of waivers and assigned him to Scranton/Wilkes-Barre. The Yankees promoted him to the major leagues on August 21. On September 6, Bard was designated for assignment. On October 24, Bard elected free agency.

Toronto Blue Jays
On February 11, 2023, Bard signed a minor league contract with the Toronto Blue Jays organization that included a non-roster invitation to spring training.

Personal life
Bard's older brother, Daniel, is a major league baseball player, currently with the Colorado Rockies.  His cousin, John Andreoli, is also a professional baseball player for the Minnesota Twins organization.

See also
Rule 5 draft results

References

External links

Living people
1990 births
Baseball players from Charlotte, North Carolina
Major League Baseball pitchers
Los Angeles Angels players
Tampa Bay Rays players
New York Yankees players
Georgia Tech Yellow Jackets baseball players
Gulf Coast Twins players
Elizabethton Twins players
Fort Myers Miracle players
Cedar Rapids Kernels players
Chattanooga Lookouts players
Rochester Red Wings players
Salt Lake Bees players
Durham Bulls players
Brewster Whitecaps players